The women's discus throw event at the 2015 African Games was held on 16 September.

Results

References

Discus
2015 in women's athletics